Neil McGregor (born 17 July 1985, in Irvine), is a Scottish football defender who has previously played in the Scottish Premier League for Dundee.

Career

McGregor began his career with Kilmarnock. He played in the Scottish Youth Cup winning team of 2004. Killie won 1–0 against Rangers at Rugby Park in the final. McGregor along with Steven Masterton and Steven Naismith (all three played in the final) were promoted to the first team squad shortly afterwards. He failed to make the grade with Killie and was later released. He subsequently signed for Clyde in the summer of 2005, and scored on his début for them in the Scottish Challenge Cup against Brechin City. McGregor flourished after joining Clyde, and was awarded the Man of the Match award during Clyde's 5–2 extra time defeat to Rangers in the Scottish League Cup.

McGregor was appointed captain in January 2007, following the departure of incumbent captain Paul McHale. However, he was then sidelined by injury for the rest of the season, allowing Michael McGowan to take over the captaincy. At the start of the following season McGowan was officially appointed as team captain with McGregor being given the role of club captain, which he held until July 2008.

McGregor was selected in the SPFA First Division Team of 2006–07. In August 2007, Carlisle United were reported to have tabled an offer of £100,000 for the player. However, this offer fell through when Carlisle sacked their manager.

McGregor was released by Clyde in June 2009 along with the rest of the out of contract players, due to the club's financial position. He went on to sign for Dunfermline Athletic.

On 21 July 2011 it was announced after impressing while on trial that McGregor had signed a one-year deal for Dundee FC. On 31 January 2013 McGregor left Dundee and signed for Scottish 2nd Division side Ayr United, on a loan deal until the end of the season.

His younger brother Calum is also a footballer, and was previously on the books of Clyde.

On 31 July 2013 McGregor joined Junior side Hurlford United.

Statistics
Correct as of 30 July 2009

See also
 2005–06 Clyde F.C. season, 2006–07 Clyde F.C. season, 2007–08 Clyde F.C. season, 2008–09 Clyde F.C. season
 2009–10 Dunfermline Athletic F.C. season

References

External links

1985 births
Living people
Scottish footballers
Kilmarnock F.C. players
Clyde F.C. players
Dunfermline Athletic F.C. players
Dundee F.C. players
Ayr United F.C. players
Hurlford United F.C. players
Scottish Premier League players
Scottish Football League players
Scottish Junior Football Association players
Association football defenders
Footballers from Irvine, North Ayrshire